Piereus Store is a historic commercial building located at Charlottesville, Virginia, USA. It was built between 1835 and 1840 and is a two-story, two-bay, brick building measuring two rooms deep. It has a gable roof and a single story Victorian front porch. It is one of two houses remaining from the "Piereus" phase of industrial development along the Rivanna River.

It was listed on the National Register of Historic Places in 1983.

References

Commercial buildings on the National Register of Historic Places in Virginia
Commercial buildings completed in 1840
Buildings and structures in Charlottesville, Virginia
National Register of Historic Places in Charlottesville, Virginia